WPXQ-TV (channel 69) is a television station licensed to Newport, Rhode Island, United States, broadcasting the Ion Television network to the Providence area. Owned and operated by the Ion Media subsidiary of the E. W. Scripps Company, it shares transmitter facilities with former sister station WLWC (channel 28) on Champlin Hill near Ashaway.

Despite originally being licensed to Block Island, Rhode Island, WPXQ was never carried by former cable operator Block Island Cable TV.

History 
The FCC was persuaded to allocate channel 69 (WPXQ's original analog frequency) to Block Island by Ted Robinson, an island resident, who claimed during the allocation filing process in 1984–85 that an independent TV station providing niche programming from there would serve the public interest better. Robinson subsequently ran into local opposition to tower siting, and sold out his interest to Ray Yorke, who obtained the initial construction permit. The station began broadcasting a few hours of old movies daily in 1992 using the callsign WOST-TV (meaning Ocean State Television, the original owners). By 1996, the station was owned by Paxson Communications, which had implemented their infomercials (via their inTV network) and religious programming. The station became WPXQ in 1998, and in August of that year began to run programming from the Pax TV network (later i: Independent Television; now Ion Television).

Technical information

Subchannels
The station's digital signal is multiplexed:

Analog-to-digital conversion
WPXQ-TV discontinued regular programming on its analog signal, over UHF channel 69, on June 12, 2009, the official date in which full-power television stations in the United States transitioned from analog to digital broadcasts under federal mandate. The station's digital signal remained on its pre-transition UHF channel 17, using PSIP to display the station's virtual channel as its former UHF analog channel 69, which was among the high band UHF channels (52-69) that were removed from broadcasting use as a result of the transition.

Notes

References

External links 

Ion Television affiliates
Laff (TV network) affiliates
Scripps News affiliates
Bounce TV affiliates
Defy TV affiliates
TrueReal affiliates
PXQ-TV
Television channels and stations established in 1992
1992 establishments in Rhode Island
Mass media in Providence, Rhode Island
Newport, Rhode Island